James Rahilly (born 15 June 1979) is a former Australian rules footballer who played with Geelong in the Australian Football League (AFL). He is currently serving as an assistant coach with the Adelaide Football Club.

Rahilly played his early football at South Warrnambool but was recruited from the Geelong Falcons in the TAC Cup. A defender, he received a 1998 AFL Rising Star nomination in his sixth league game, against Carlton at the MCG, where he had 22 disposals. Although Geelong made it into the final in three of the seasons he was at the club, Rahilly was never selected for a finals game. Rahilly was, however, a member of the Geelong reserves team which won the 2002 Victorian Football League (VFL) premiership and was awarded the Norm Goss Memorial Medal for his efforts in the grand final. He also won Geelong's "Best Clubman" award, in 2003.

He returned to the VFL in 2008 as an assistant coach and was then appointed to Chris Scott's senior coaching staff for the 2011 AFL season. At the end of 2020 James was appointed as Adelaide's forward line coach, assistant coach to Matthew Nicks for season 2021.

References

1979 births
Australian rules footballers from Victoria (Australia)
Geelong Football Club players
Geelong Falcons players
South Warrnambool Football Club players
Living people